Ivo Rossen (born 14 March 1982) is a Dutch professional footballer who plays as a centre back. He formerly played for NEC, FC Dordrecht, Go Ahead Eagles, FC Zwolle, FC Den Bosch and Sint-Truiden, before returning to FC Eindhoven.

External links
 Voetbal International profile

1982 births
Living people
Dutch footballers
NEC Nijmegen players
FC Dordrecht players
Go Ahead Eagles players
PEC Zwolle players
FC Eindhoven players
Sint-Truidense V.V. players
Eerste Divisie players
Footballers from Nijmegen
Association football defenders